William Timothy Edward Smale (born 28 February 2001) is a Welsh cricketer. He made his first-class debut for North West Warriors in the 2019 Inter-Provincial Championship on 12 August 2019 in Ireland. Prior to his first-class debut, he played for the Ireland under-19 cricket team in the Division 1 Europe Qualifier of the 2020 Under-19 Cricket World Cup qualification tournament. He was the leading run-scorer for the team in the tournament, with 185 runs in five matches.

He made his List A debut for North West Warriors in the 2019 Inter-Provincial Cup in Ireland on 26 August 2019. During the winter of 2019, Smale played club cricket for Sydney Cricket Club in Australia. He made his Twenty20 debut for North West Warriors in the 2020 Inter-Provincial Trophy on 20 August 2020.

References

External links
 

2001 births
Living people
Welsh cricketers
Sportspeople from Newport, Wales
North West Warriors cricketers
People educated at King's College, Taunton
Alumni of Cardiff Metropolitan University